Bart De Roover (born 21 August 1967 in Belgium) is a Belgian retired footballer who now works as head coach of K. Lyra-Lierse Berlaar in his home country.

Career

De Roover started his senior career with K.F.C. Zwarte Leeuw. After that, he played for K.S.C. Lokeren Oost-Vlaanderen, K.A.A. Gent, and Lierse S.K. In 1997, he signed for NAC Breda in the Dutch Eredivisie, where he made twenty-one league appearances and scored one goal.

Honours
Lierse
Belgian First Division: 1996–97

References

External links 
 Worrying and annoying: the fate of a banker
 Forgotten player - Bart De Roover 
 De Roover, beyond frustration 
 "Worse things are happening" 
 "He may do a little less well"
 

1967 births
Belgian footballers
Association football defenders
Living people
K.S.C. Lokeren Oost-Vlaanderen players
K.A.A. Gent players
Lierse S.K. players
NAC Breda players
Belgian expatriate footballers
Belgian expatriate sportspeople in the Netherlands
Expatriate footballers in the Netherlands
Belgium international footballers
Belgian football managers
S.V. Zulte Waregem managers
S.K. Beveren managers
Royal Antwerp F.C. managers
Lommel S.K. managers
Belgian expatriate football managers
Belgian expatriate sportspeople in Saudi Arabia